Patrick Marvin "Buck" Gavin (June 22, 1895 – April 12, 1981) was a professional American football player who played running back for seven seasons for Buffalo, Detroit, Rock Island Independents, Green Bay Packers, and Hammond Pros. His full name was Patrick Marvin Gavin, and he was born in Amenia, NY.

Career
1923 - Green Bay Packers (7-2-1)

References

American football running backs
Hammond Pros players
Green Bay Packers players
Detroit Tigers (NFL) players
Buffalo All-Americans players
Rock Island Independents players
1895 births
1981 deaths